Bjørn Endreson (20 January 1922 – 12 November 1998) was a Norwegian actor, stage producer, and theatre director.

He was born in Bærum. He worked as actor and stage producer at Rogaland Teater from 1957 to 1960, and served as theatre director from 1960 to 1970. He founded the children's theatre at Rogaland Teater.

From 1970 he translated and staged a large number of Samuel Beckett's plays for Det Norske Teatret.

Endreson issued the poetry collection Kadens in 1946.

External links

References

1922 births
1998 deaths
Norwegian theatre directors
Norwegian male stage actors
People from Bærum
Norwegian theatre managers and producers
20th-century Norwegian male actors